Vishnupriya Ramchandran Pillai (born 22 February 1987 in Bahrain), known mononymously and better as Vishnupriya, is an Indian actress, dancer and model. She started off her career participating in the dance reality show Vodafone Thakadimi which was aired on Asianet. She made her acting debut in 2007 with Speed Track, playing a supporting character. Later, she played the lead character in Keralotsavam 2009 and got noticed for her character in Penpattanam (2010). Since then, she has played supporting roles in various films. She made her Tamil cinema debut in Naanga (2011). She had performed for AMMA show in 2013. She has also participated in a reality show Star Challenge on Flowers TV. In 2019, she starred in a Tamil film, V1 with Ram Arun Castro. In a review of the film, one critic noted that "Arun Castro and Vishnu Priya adapt themselves well and shine in the given characters" while another stated that "Ram Arun and Vishnupriya are apt in their respective roles".

Early life
Vishnupriya was born and brought up at Bahrain. She had done her schooling from The Indian School, Bahrain and completed her BBA degree from The Birla Institute of Technology International Centre. She had participated in various competitions and won the Inter-school championship for Bharata Natyam during her school days.

Filmography

Acting

Television

Advertisements
 Friend and Guide
 Southern Jewellery
 Speak for India (Federal Bank)
 Welgate Properties

References

External links 
 

Living people
1987 births
Indian expatriates in Bahrain
Indian film actresses
Actresses in Malayalam cinema
Actresses in Tamil cinema
Actresses in Malayalam television